Ainsley Amohaere Gardiner  is a film producer from New Zealand.

Early life 
Gardiner was born in Palmerston North and grew up in the Wellington suburb of Wadestown, attending Wadestown Primary School. Her mother is former MP Pauline Gardiner, and her father was a civil servant and politician, Wira Gardiner. When she was about 12 years old the family moved to Whakatāne. Gardiner is of Te Whānau-ā-Apanui, Ngāti Pikiao and Ngāti Awa descent.

Career 
In 1995, Gardiner completed the Avalon Film and TV production course, and went on to work with producer Larry Parr at Kahukura Productions. She began producing short films, and also co-produced a 26-part series Lovebites.

In 2003, she produced her first feature film, Kombi Nation, and co-produced Two Cars, One Night with Catherine Fitzgerald. The film, directed by Taika Waititi, became the first New Zealand short to be nominated for an Academy Award for Best Short Film.

In 2004, Gardiner and actor/producer Cliff Curtis formed a film production company focused on indigenous stories, called Whenua Films. The company received start-up funding from the New Zealand Film Commission. Gardiner worked with Curtis and Waititi to produce Tama Tū, Eagle vs Shark and the highly successful Boy, which set a new record for the highest grossing New Zealand film.

In 2007, Gardiner began co-presenting Iti Pounamu, a Māori Television series showcasing New Zealand short films. In 2009 Gardiner wrote and directed Mokopuna, a short film about a part-Māori girl who struggles to embrace her roots; the film won the best short film award at the Canadian indigenous film festival Dreamspeakers.

In 2017, Gardiner joined a team of women directors and writers to create the feature film Waru, which focuses on child abuse in New Zealand.

Honours and awards
In 2010, Gardiner and Curtis shared the SPADA New Zealand Screen Industry Awards title of Independent Producer of the Year.

In the 2018 Queen's Birthday Honours, Gardiner was appointed a Member of the New Zealand Order of Merit, for services to film and television.

Screenography

References

Living people
Ngāti Awa people
Ngāti Pikiao people
Te Whānau-ā-Apanui people
New Zealand film producers
Members of the New Zealand Order of Merit
People from Wellington City
Year of birth missing (living people)
21st-century New Zealand women
New Zealand women film producers